The Politics of Trentino-Alto Adige/Südtirol (Trentino-Alto Adige/Südtirol, Italy) takes place in a framework of a parliamentary representative democracy, whereby the President of Regional Government is the head of government, and of a pluriform multi-party system.  Executive power is exercised by the Regional Government and Legislative power is vested in both the government and the Regional Council.  However, since a constitutional reform in 1972, almost all the executive and legislative powers are devolved to the two provinces of which the region is composed: Trentino and the South Tyrol.

The politics of Trentino takes place in a framework of a presidential representative democracy, whereby the governor is heads of government, while the politics of South Tyrol retains a parliamentary system, in which the governor is usually the most voted provincial deputy and heads the provincial government.

Executive branch

The Regional Government (Giunta Regionale, Landesregierung) is presided by the President of the Region (Presidente della Regione, Landeshauptmann) and is composed by the President and the Ministers (Assessori), who are currently 5, including two Vice Presidents. Since 2001, the Presidents of the two Provinces alternate as President of the Region, with the one who's not in charge serving as First Vice President.

Current composition
President: Ugo Rossi (PATT–Trentino)
First Vice President: Arno Kompatscher (SVP–South Tyrol)
Vice President: Roberto Bizzo (PD–South Tyrol)
Minister: Luigi Chiocchetti (UAL–Trentino)
Minister: Martha Stocker (SVP–South Tyrol)

List of presidents

Provincial executives

Trentino

South Tyrol

Legislative branch

The Regional Council of Trentino-Alto Adige (Consiglio Regionale del Trentino-Alto Adige) is composed of 70 members, 35 from Trentino and 35 from South Tyrol. The regional deputies are elected separately as provincial deputies. In practice the Regional Council is the meeting of the two Provincial Councils.

Local government

Municipalities in Trentino

Municipalities in South Tyrol

Political parties and elections

The Region has actually two different system of parties: one for each Province. Since the constitutional reform of 2001, regional elections are nothing more than two separate provincial elections and the Region does not provide anymore vote totals region-wide.

Latest provincial elections

Trentino

South Tyrol

Latest general election in Trentino-Alto Adige/Südtirol

Sources
Trentino Alto-Adige Region – Elections
Provincial Council of Trento – Legislatures
Provincial Council of Bolzano – Legislatures
Provincial Government of Trento – Elections
Provincial Government of Bolzano – Elections
Cattaneo Institute – Archive of Election Data
Parties and Elections in Europe – Province of Trento
Parties and Elections in Europe – Province of Bolzano
Ministry of the Interior – Historical Archive of Elections
"Political parties in Alto Adige from 1945 to 2005", an essay by Gunther Pallaver

External links
Trentino-Alto Adige/Südtirol Region
Constitution of Trentino-Alto Adige/Südtirol 
Provincial Government of Trento
Provincial Council of Trento
Provincial Government of Bolzano
Provincial Council of Bolzano

 
Government of Trentino-Alto Adige/Südtirol